Jackson Township is one of eleven townships in Clay County, Indiana. As of the 2010 census, its population was 2,739 and it contained 1,144 housing units.

History
Jackson Township was established about 1832. It was named for Andrew Jackson, who was then serving as President of the United States.

Geography

Cities and towns
 Brazil (southeast quarter)

Unincorporated towns
 Asherville
 Hoosierville
 Lap Corner
 Prairie City
 Roadman Corner
 Stearleyville
(This list is based on USGS data and may include former settlements.)

Adjacent townships
 Van Buren Township (north)
 Washington Township, Putnam County (northeast)
 Cass Township (east)
 Washington Township (southeast)
 Sugar Ridge Township (south)
 Perry Township (southwest)
 Posey Township (west)
 Brazil Township (northwest)

Major highways
  Interstate 70
  Indiana State Road 42
  Indiana State Road 59

Cemeteries
The township contains five cemeteries: Kealber, Neidlinger, Poplar, Wesley Chapel and Zenor.

References
 
 United States Census Bureau cartographic boundary files

External links

 Indiana Township Association
 United Township Association of Indiana

Townships in Clay County, Indiana
Terre Haute metropolitan area
Townships in Indiana
1830s establishments in Indiana
Populated places established in the 1830s